The 1964 U.S. National Championships (now known as the US Open) was a tennis tournament that took place on the outdoor grass courts at the West Side Tennis Club, Forest Hills in New York City, United States. The tournament ran from 2 September until 13 September. It was the 84th staging of the U.S. National Championships, and the fourth Grand Slam tennis event of 1964.

Finals

Men's singles

 Roy Emerson defeated  Fred Stolle  6–4, 6–1, 6–4

Women's singles

 Maria Bueno defeated  Carole Caldwell Graebner 6–1, 6–0

Men's doubles
 Chuck McKinley /  Dennis Ralston defeated   Graham Stilwell /  Mike Sangster 6–3, 6–2, 6–4

Women's doubles
 Billie Jean Moffitt /  Karen Susman defeated  Margaret Smith /  Lesley Turner 3–6, 6–2, 6–4

Mixed doubles
 Margaret Smith /  John Newcombe defeated  Judy Tegart /  Ed Rubinoff 10–8, 4–6, 6–3

References

External links
Official US Open website

 
U.S. National Championships
U.S. National Championships (tennis) by year
U.S. National Championships
U.S. National Championships